Catapilla is the first studio album by the prog rock band Catapilla. It was released in 1971 on Vertigo Records.

Track listing
All songs written by Graham Wilson, Thierry Reinhardt, Robert Calvert, Malcolm Frith, and Anna Meek.

Side one
"Naked Death" - 15:42
"Tumbleweed" - 3:57
"Promises" - 5:43

Side two
"Embryonic Fusion" - 24:08

Personnel
 Anna Meek - vocals
 Dave Taylor – bass guitar
 Graham Wilson – guitar
 Hugh Eaglestone – tenor saxophone
 Robert Calvert – alto & tenor saxophones
 Thierry Rheinhardt – tenor & alto flute, clarinet
 Malcolm Frith – drums

References

1971 debut albums
Catapilla albums
Vertigo Records albums